Apomempsis densepunctata is a species of beetle in the family Cerambycidae. It was described by Stephan von Breuning in 1939. It is known from Gabon and the Democratic Republic of the Congo.

Its type locality is Arebi, Haut-Uele, DCR.

References

Morimopsini
Beetles described in 1939
Taxa named by Stephan von Breuning (entomologist)